Bonnie Bo (also can be read as Bonnie Bai; traditional Chinese: 柏邦妮; simplified Chinese: 柏邦妮; form name: 张珊珊) was born on 1982. She is an author and screenwriter. Bonnie graduated in Literature and reading from Beijing Film Academy. In 2005 she published a personal collection of essays known as "The Same As Bonnie Love You." Bo writes for fashion magazine, Interview, and worked as a film critic and columnist from 2003. She interviewed Maggie Cheung, Gong Li, Ang Lee, Hou Hsiao-hsien and other celebrities. She worked as a screenwriter for the TV shows Yan Qing prodigal son, Flea on the drum when the move and Than I love my. She wrote the screenplay for the movie Ballad of loess and part of the 2008 remake of Dream of Red Mansions.

Early life
Bonnie's parents worked in research institutes. Once, her mother had a high fever and her father wanted to take her to the hospital. Bonnie's mom responded: "I did not put on make-up, I will not go out!" Bo later recalled, "Mother, who was insistent on makeup, simply shows a great attitude to life: a woman, no matter when, has to be beautiful and proud to face life, to be able to lift her head high."

Bonnie was the champion of her province's art examination and was admitted to Nanjing Arts Institute. After a year, she became interested in film, leading her to become the first dropout in the school's history. In 2002, she entered Beijing Film Academy and spent four years there.

Career
In March 2008, Bo joined a group of eight other writers to script a remake of "Dream of Red Mansions". Three months later, the "youthful dream team" had finished 50 drafts. Bonnie was responsible for eight scenes.

Filmography
"Flea on the drum when the move" (screenwriter)
"Prodigal Yan Qing" (screenwriter)
"Loess Ballad" (screenwriter)
New version of "Dream of Red Mansions" (writer)
The movie "Mulan" (screenwriter)
"Like love you like Bonnie 'essays
"Not luxury", "false" celebrity interviews set

External links

References 

1982 births
Living people
Screenwriters from Jiangsu
People's Republic of China writers